Crystal Bay is a bay on Lake Superior in Lake County, in the U.S. state of Minnesota.

Crystal Bay was named for the crystalline rocks found on the lake shore.

References

Bodies of water of Lake County, Minnesota
Bays of Minnesota